And Then Nothing Turned Itself Inside-Out is the ninth studio album by American indie rock band Yo La Tengo, released on February 22, 2000, by Matador Records. The album received acclaim from critics.

Recording and release 
And Then Nothing Turned Itself Inside-Out was recorded at Alex the Great in Nashville, Tennessee, and mixed at the Big House in Manhattan, New York City. The album was produced by Roger Moutenot and released on February 22, 2000, by Matador Records. The title of the album is likely derived from a Sun Ra quote: "...At first there was nothing...then nothing turned itself inside-out and became something". The album artwork is made up of photographs by surrealist photographer and Yale professor Gregory Crewdson.

The album reached number 138 on the Billboard 200 in the United States, their first to do so. As of January 2003, the album had sold 114,000 copies in the US, according to Nielsen SoundScan.

Music and lyrics 
And Then Nothing Turned Itself Inside-Out marks a creative shift in Yo La Tengo's songwriting with a greatly slower approach. The band continued to expand on their simplistic songwriting. Many songs on the album are soft ballads with very airy percussion and background noises. However, the guitars and bass provide a strong undertone of reverberation. The album also features an array of backing instruments such as vibraphone and drum machines, which all lend an expansion of musical textures and differentiation of timbre.

Yo La Tengo deliver more subdued art pop songs on this album than on any other. However, their noise rock influence is also most present in songs like "Saturday", "Cherry Chapstick", "Tired Hippo", and the 17-minute epic "Night Falls on Hoboken". The title "Let's Save Tony Orlando's House" comes from an episode of The Simpsons, titled "Marge on the Lam". It is the name of a telethon that actor Troy McClure previously hosted. During this period, many of their tracks were given temp-titles based on McClure's filmography.

The song "The Crying of Lot G" is a reference to Thomas Pynchon's novel The Crying of Lot 49. "You Can Have It All" is a cover of the George McCrae song, originally written by Harry Wayne Casey of KC and the Sunshine Band. Yo La Tengo's take is of a distinctly different style, with a much slower tempo. A techno version of "You Can Have It All" was used as Northwest Airlines's theme song under the Now You're Flying Smart slogan. The track "Our Way to Fall" appears in an episode of Six Feet Under titled "Driving Mr. Mossback" (season 2, episode 4).

Critical reception 

And Then Nothing Turned Itself Inside-Out received acclaim from music critics. AllMusic reviewer Heather Phares felt that the album "isn't as immediate as some of the group's earlier work, but it's just as enduring, proving that Yo La Tengo is the perfect band to grow old with". The album appeared at number 8 in The Village Voices Pazz & Jop critics' poll for 2000.

In 2009, Pitchfork ranked the album at number 37 on its list of The Top 200 Albums of the 2000s. Similarly, the album was ranked at number 77 in Rolling Stones list of 100 Best Albums of the 2000s. In 2020, the album was ranked at number 48 in PopMatters list of the 100 Best Albums of the 2000s. In 2018, Pitchfork ranked it fifth on its list of "The 30 Best Dream Pop Albums". In 2019, the album was ranked 82nd on the Guardian's 100 Best Albums of the 21st Century list. In 2017, Treble ranked the album at thirteenth in their "Top 100 Indie Rock albums of the '00s".

Track listing

Personnel
Credits are adapted from the album's liner notes.
 Yo La Tengo – performers, writers (tracks 1–6; 8–13)
 Roger Moutenot – production
 Greg Calbi – mastering
 Dan – photography
 Gregory Crewdson – photography
 Susie Ibarra – percussion (tracks 1 and 3)
 Kris Gillespie – drum programming (track 4)
 David Henry – cello (track 7), additional recording
 Tim Harris – cello (track 10)
 Bil Emmons – additional recording 
 Peter Walsh – additional recording 
 Wayne Dorell – additional recording

Charts

References

External links 

2000 albums
Yo La Tengo albums